Williamstown North is a suburb in Melbourne, Victoria, Australia,  south-west of Melbourne's Central Business District, located within the City of Hobsons Bay local government area.

The suburb is bounded to the north by the Warrnambool railway line, to the west by the Altona branch of the Werribee railway line, to the east by Champion Road, and to the south by Kororoit Creek Road.

Williamstown North is home to the Newport Railway Museum in Champion Road, on the south-east corner of the Newport Workshops. It is a short walk from the North Williamstown railway station. The Museum features the largest collection of Victorian Railways steam locomotives. Other exhibits include electric and diesel locomotives, suburban and country passenger carriages, guards vans, a selection of freight wagons and numerous railway artefacts.

History

Williamstown Cemetery was established in 1857.

Williamstown North Post Office opened on 1 April 1878 and closed in 1980.

See also
 City of Williamstown – Williamstown North was previously within this former local government area.

References

External links
Hobsons Bay Community Online Forum

Suburbs of Melbourne
Suburbs of the City of Hobsons Bay